This is a list of commercial banks in Uganda

 ABC Bank Uganda Limited
 Absa Bank Uganda Limited
 Bank of Africa Uganda Limited
 Bank of Baroda Uganda Limited
 Bank of India Uganda Limited
 Cairo Bank Uganda
 Centenary Bank
 Citibank Uganda
 DFCU Bank
 Diamond Trust Bank
 Ecobank Uganda
 Equity Bank Uganda Limited
 Exim Bank (Uganda)
 Finance Trust Bank
 Guaranty Trust Bank
 Housing Finance Bank
 I&M Bank Uganda
 KCB Bank Uganda Limited
 NCBA Bank Uganda
 Opportunity Bank Uganda Limited
 PostBank Uganda
 Stanbic Bank Uganda Limited
 Standard Chartered Uganda
 Tropical Bank
 United Bank for Africa

See also
Banking in Uganda
List of Microfinance Deposit-taking Institutions in Uganda
List of licensed credit institutions in Uganda

References

External links
 Kenyan Banks In Major Ugandan Expansion
Uganda: Foreign Banks Dominate As of 11 January 2012.

 
Banks
Uganda
Uganda